The Scofield-Sanor House is a historic house in Columbus, Ohio, United States. The house was built in 1899 and was listed on the National Register of Historic Places in 1986. The Scofield-Sanor House was built at a time when East Broad Street was a tree-lined avenue featuring the most ornate houses in Columbus; the house reflects the character of the area at the time. The building is also part of the 21st & E. Broad Historic Group on the Columbus Register of Historic Properties, added to the register in 1988.

Lovett T. Scofield, president of the Andrus-Scofield Company, lived in the house from 1910 to 1914. Daniel G. Sanor lived there later on, from 1918 to 1931. Gertrude Starr was a subsequent resident, renting several rooms. The Ohio State Grange acquired the property in 1950, and has used it as its headquarters since then.

See also
 National Register of Historic Places listings in Columbus, Ohio

References

External links

Houses completed in 1899
National Register of Historic Places in Columbus, Ohio
Houses in Columbus, Ohio
Houses on the National Register of Historic Places in Ohio
Columbus Register properties
Neoclassical architecture in Ohio
Broad Street (Columbus, Ohio)